This is a list of the deadliest animals to humans worldwide, measured by the number of humans killed per year.  Different lists have varying criteria and definitions, so lists from different sources disagree and can be contentious.  This article contains a compilation of lists from several reliable sources.

List

See also
 List of large carnivores known to prey on humans

Notes

References

Further reading
 What Animals Kill The Most Humans Each Year?, World Atlas
 Malaria, World Health Organization
 Animal bites, World Health Organization
 West Niles virus, World Health Organization

External links
 The Deadliest Animal in the World, Gates Notes
 These Are The Top 15 Deadliest Animals on Earth, Science Alert
 Top 10 Deadliest Animals To Humans In The World, Toptenia
 The 25 Most Dangerous Animals In The World, List 25
 The Most Dangerous Animals in the World, Animal Danger
 Top 10 Most Dangerous Animals In The World, Conservation Institute
 Schistosomiasis: Still a Cause of Significant Morbidity and Mortality, National Center for Biotechnology Information, U.S. National Library of Medicine

Lists of animals
Animals
Animal-related accidents and incidents